The 2019 Dacorum Borough Council election took place on 2 May 2019 to elect members of the Dacorum Borough Council in England. It was held on the same day as other local elections.

Summary Result

|-

Ward Results

Adeyfield East

Adeyfield West

Aldbury & Wigginton

Apsley & Corner Hall

Ashridge

Bennetts End

Berkhamsted Castle

Berkhamsted East

Berkhamsted West

Bovingdon, Flaunden & Chipperfield

Boxmoor

Chaulden & Warners End

Gadebridge

Grovehill

Hemel Hempstead Town

Highfield

Kings Langley

Leverstock Green

Nash Mills

Northchurch

Tring Central

Tring East

Tring West & Rural

Watling

Woodhall Farm

By-elections

Leverstock Green

Tring Central

Boxmoor

Berkhamsted West

References 

2019 English local elections
May 2019 events in the United Kingdom
2019
2010s in Hertfordshire